Deborah Ann Bowman-Sullivan (born 4 July 1963) in Southport, Queensland) is an Australian former field hockey defender, who won the gold medal with the Women's National Team at the 1988 Summer Olympics in Seoul, South Korea.

As captain, Bowman led the Australian Women's team to Olympic gold in Seoul in 1988. This was Australia's first ever Olympic gold medal in any team event.

In 2000 Bowman was awarded the Australian Sports Medal.

In 2009 Bowman was inducted into the Queensland Sport Hall of Fame.

See also
 Field hockey at the 1988 Summer Olympics

References 

http://www.goldcoastsport.com.au/athlete/debbie-bowman-sullivan/
http://www.abc.net.au/olympics/2008/results/historical/athletes/2251.htm

External links
 

1963 births
Living people
Olympic medalists in field hockey
Recipients of the Australian Sports Medal
Olympic field hockey players of Australia
Australian female field hockey players
Field hockey players at the 1988 Summer Olympics
Field hockey players at the 1992 Summer Olympics
Medalists at the 1988 Summer Olympics
Olympic gold medalists for Australia
20th-century Australian women